Dukagjin Karanezi (born 11 June 1993) is an Austrian professional football player and manager, who plays as a left-back for Landesliga Burgenland club SC Ritzing.

References

External links

1993 births
Living people
Austrian footballers
Austrian people of Albanian descent
Association football defenders
Austrian Regionalliga players
2. Liga (Austria) players
SV Mattersburg players
SC Ritzing players